Gruszka is a Polish place name. It may refer to:

 Gruszka, Lublin Voivodeship (east Poland)
 Gruszka, Kielce County in Świętokrzyskie Voivodeship (south-central Poland)
 Gruszka, Końskie County in Świętokrzyskie Voivodeship (south-central Poland)
 Gruszka, Warmian-Masurian Voivodeship (north Poland)